Harold E. Ennes was a broadcasting pioneer who authored many textbooks for broadcast and broadcast-related communications training and was a member of the Indianapolis chapter of the Society of Broadcast Engineers. He was a member of SBE's national Certification Committee and made many contributions to the early development of the SBE Certification Program.

To encourage greater growth, the Chapter established in 1980 the Harold Ennes Scholarship Fund Trust in his memory. The Scholarship Trust was transferred by the Chapter to the SBE national organization to administer in 1981.

Over the years, the purposes of the Trust were expanded. In addition to granting scholarships, the Trust now is involved with the funding and presentation of broadcast engineering-related educational programs, seminars and workshops. It also helps to underwrite costs associated with publishing technical books and manuals.

The name of the Trust was changed in 1995 to the Harold Ennes Educational Foundation Trust to reflect its expanded role. Some of the goals of the Trust are to encourage the entry of minorities and women into broadcast technical fields, to evaluate technical training courses and to act as a liaison with similar international organizations to develop and enhance common technical training courses.

References

Sources
Society of Broadcast Engineers
Radio Magazine Online
Broadcast Engineering Magazine

Year of birth missing
Year of death missing
American pioneers
American engineers